Percrocutidae is an extinct family of hyena-like feliform carnivores endemic to Asia, Africa, and Southern Europe from the Middle Miocene through the Pliocene,  existing for about .

The first percrocutids are known from the middle Miocene of Europe and western Asia and belonged to the genus Percrocuta. Percrocuta already had large premolars, but did not carry such a massive bite as the later form Dinocrocuta, from the later Miocene. Originally, these carnivores were placed with the hyenas in the family Hyaenidae. Today, most scientists consider the Percrocutidae to be a distinct family - although usually as sister-taxa/immediate outgroup to Hyaenidae. Sometimes it is placed with the family Stenoplesictidae into the superfamily Stenoplesictoidea. However, studies in the 2020s have placed Dinocrocuta and Percrocuta as true hyaenids, simultaneously invalidating the family Percrocutidae.

Taxonomy

Classification

The list follows McKenna and Bell's Classification of Mammals for prehistoric genera (1997). In contrast to McKenna and Bell's classification, they are not included as a subfamily into the Hyaenidae but as a separate family Percrocutidae.

References

 Jordi Agustí: Mammoths, Sabertooths and Hominids 65 Million Years of Mammalian Evolution in Europe, Columbia University Press, 2002.  

Miocene carnivorans
Prehistoric mammal families
Miocene first appearances
Piacenzian extinctions